The Parish Church of Our Lady of Mount Carmel, or simply known as the Carmelite Church or Balluta Parish Church, is a neo-gothic Roman Catholic parish church located in Balluta Bay in the town of St Julian's, Malta.

History

The present church, which is a prominent landmark in St Julians, dates from the early to the mid 20th century. The original Carmelite church was a small neo-gothic chapel which was built in 1859 on plans by Giuseppe Bonavia. The church was rebuilt in 1877 on plans by Emanuele Luigi Galizia. Afterwards it was handed over to the Carmelite friars who rebuilt it again in 1900 on plans by architect Gustavo R. Vincenti. After his death Joseph M. Spiteri took over. The church was then enlarged in 1958. In 1974, the area around the church was created into a parish, separate from the parish of St Julians, and the Carmelite church was chosen as the parish church. The church was dedicated on December 12, 1984.

References

St. Julian's, Malta
20th-century Roman Catholic church buildings in Malta
Carmelite churches in Malta
National Inventory of the Cultural Property of the Maltese Islands
19th-century establishments in Malta
Gothic Revival church buildings in Malta